The 1980 NCAA Men's Division I Outdoor Track and Field Championships were contested June 3−7 at the 58th annual NCAA-sanctioned track meet to determine the individual and team national champions of men's collegiate Division I outdoor track and field events in the United States. 

This year's meet was contested at Memorial Stadium at the University of Texas at Austin in Austin, Texas. This was the third time the Longhorns hosted the event, and the first since 1974.

UTEP topped the team standings for the third consecutive year and, therefore, claimed their fourth national title.

Team result 
 Note: Top 10 only
 (H) = Hosts

References

NCAA Men's Outdoor Track and Field Championship
NCAA Division I Outdoor Track and Field Championships
NCAA
NCAA Division I Outdoor Track and Field Championships